Engelina Hameetman-Schlette (20 August 1875 – 27 September 1954) was a Dutch painter. Her work was part of the painting event in the art competition at the 1928 Summer Olympics.

References

1875 births
1954 deaths
20th-century Dutch painters
Dutch women painters
Olympic competitors in art competitions
Artists from The Hague
20th-century Dutch women artists